Hannes Messemer (17 May 1924 – 2 November 1991) was a German actor from Dillingen an der Donau, Bavaria.

Biography

World War II 
Messemer served on the Eastern Front of World War II and was eventually captured by Soviet soldiers. He managed to escape and make it back to Germany on foot.

Acting career 
After the war, Messemer tried his hand at several jobs, before falling into acting in 1946. With only his natural talent and no training, he successfully secured roles with several major theatre companies in Tübingen, Hamburg, Munich and Berlin in the following ten years.

His big break in films came with a role in Rose Bernd in 1956. He was then cast in the major role of Colonel Rossdorf in the production of The Devil Strikes at Night the following year - a role which saw him awarded a Best Actor accolade. A series of successful roles followed, including The Doctor of Stalingrad, Der Transport (Destination Death), Die Brücke des Schicksals and the comedy Babette Goes to War with Brigitte Bardot. He achieved critical international acclaim for his role as Colonel Muller in the Roberto Rossellini production of General della Rovere (1959), with the film winning the Golden Lion at Venice that year.

Messemer is probably best known for his role as Oberst von Luger, the Kommandant in The Great Escape (1963).

He continued to star in TV and theatre productions, becoming a familiar face to German television audiences for over 20 years. Some of his roles included major TV productions such as Union der festen Hand and Die Dämonen, as well as two years as Commissioner Deeds in the TV drama series Sergeant Berry. He also lent his distinctive voice to radio and recorded works, including the writings of Mao, and a reading of the four books of the Gospels.

Personal life 
He was married four times, and had two daughters.

Illness and death 
A heavy lifelong smoker, Messemer suffered throat cancer during the 1980s, and surgery left his voice at only a whisper. Forced to retire from acting, he appeared on German television for the last time in 1989, in a production with Agnes Fink. He died of a heart attack in Aachen on the 2nd of November, 1991, at 67 years old.

Filmography

Film

Television

External links

1924 births
1991 deaths
People from Dillingen an der Donau
German male film actors
German military personnel of World War II
German male stage actors
German male television actors
20th-century German male actors
German Film Award winners